Cid de Oliveira Nascimento (born November 23, 1910, date of death unknown) is a Brazilian former Olympic sailor in the Star class. He competed in the 1952 Summer Olympics together with Tacariju de Paula, where they finished 12th, and in the 1960 Summer Olympics together with Jorge Pontual, where they finished 9th.

References

Olympic sailors of Brazil
Brazilian male sailors (sport)
Star class sailors
Sailors at the 1952 Summer Olympics – Star
Sailors at the 1960 Summer Olympics – Star
1910 births
Year of death missing